Si Racha Junction Railway Junction is a railway station located in Surasak Subdistrict, Si Racha District, Chon Buri. It opened in July 1989 as part of the Chachoengsao Junction–Sattahip Port section. Later, the Laem Chabang Port Line, for freight trains only, opened in 1992, thus turning this station into a junction.

Train services 
 Ordinary train No. 283/284 Bangkok–Ban Phlu Ta Luang–Bangkok

References 
 
 
 

Railway stations in Thailand
1989 establishments in Thailand
Railway stations opened in 1989